The Droid Razr M (Motorola XT905/XT906/XT907) is an Android-based, 4G LTE-capable smartphone designed by Motorola as a smaller successor to the Droid Razr. It was advertised as "The full screen phone" with thin edges, though it lacked a robust resolution. It came with a light skin of Android (operating system) for Verizon Wireless (XT907), SoftBank Mobile (XT902), and Telstra as well as an unbranded retail version for the Australian market (both XT905). The Electrify M (XT901) for U.S. Cellular is a CDMA handheld with a different housing, but otherwise same specification as the Razr M.

History 

The lower-end Droid Razr M was announced alongside the Droid Razr HD and Razr Maxx HD on 5 September 2012. The Razr HD and M models ship with Android 4.0 (Ice Cream Sandwich). The Android 4.1 (Jelly Bean) upgrade for the Razr M started rolling out on Nov 9, 2012 and the upgrade to Android 4.4 (KitKat) on May 12, 2014.

RAZR i 

The RAZR i (XT890) is an almost identical edition except it has an Intel Atom Z2460 processor. This means it has more processing power, but less imaging power; however, it lacks LTE support.

See also 

 Droid Razr
 Droid Razr HD
 Motorola Xyboard
 Google Nexus
 Galaxy Nexus

References

Android (operating system) devices
Motorola mobile phones
Discontinued smartphones